Marilyn A. Walker  is an American computer scientist. She is professor of computer science and head of the Natural Language and Dialogue Systems Lab at the University of California, Santa Cruz (UCSC). Her research includes work on computational models of dialogue interaction and conversational agents, analysis of affect, sarcasm and other social phenomena in social media dialogue, acquiring causal knowledge from text, conversational summarization, interactive story and narrative generation, and statistical methods for training the dialogue manager and the language generation engine for dialogue systems.

Biography 
Walker received an M.S. in computer science from Stanford University in 1987, and an M.A in linguistics and a Ph.D. in computer and information science from the University of Pennsylvania in 1993. 
Walker was awarded a  Royal Society Wolfson Research Fellowship at the University of Sheffield from 2003 to 2009. She was inducted as a Fellow of the Association for Computational Linguistics (ACL) in December 2016 for "fundamental contributions to statistical methods for dialog optimization, to centering theory, and to expressive generation for dialog". She served as the general chair of the 2018 North American Association for Computational Linguistics (NAACL-2018) conference.

Walker pioneered the use of statistical methods for dialog optimization at AT&T Bell Labs Research where she conducted some of the first experiments on reinforcement learning for optimizing dialogue systems. She also pioneered the use of statistical NLP methods for Natural Language Generation with the development of the first statistical sentence planner for dialogue systems. Her research on Centering Theory is taught in standard textbooks on NLP.

She has published over 200 papers and is the holder of 13 U.S. patents. Her work on the evaluation of dialogue systems conducted at AT&T Bell Labs Research (PARADISE: A framework for evaluating spoken dialogue agents) is a classic, having been cited more than 800 times. At UCSC, her lab focuses on computational modeling of dialogue and user-generated content in social media such as weblogs, including spoken dialogue systems and interactive stories. She leads the Athena team, selected as one of the contenders of Alexa Prize Challenge 3, with seven lab members competing in the 2019/2020 Alexa Prize.

References

External links
  List of publications 
  from Google Scholar
  Project on Healthcare intervention
  Project on teaching computers to understand sarcasm

American women computer scientists
American computer scientists
Living people
Theoretical computer scientists
University of California, Santa Cruz faculty
Year of birth missing (living people)
University of Pennsylvania alumni
Stanford University alumni
Computational linguistics researchers
Natural language processing researchers
21st-century American women